I Hear Jesus Calling may refer to:
"I Hear Jesus Calling", a 1996 song by Audio Adrenaline from the album Bloom
I Hear Jesus Calling, a 1987 album by F. C. Barnes